Jyotirmoy Datta (born 1936) is a Bengali writer, journalist, poet, and an essayist. He worked for The Statesman, Calcutta's oldest English-language daily, as feature writer, film critic, correspondent, and associate editor. He visited the University of Chicago as a lecturer, 1966–1968, and also did a residency at the University of Iowa. He has published 2 books of verse, several novels and collections of essays and short stories.  Datta currently lives in Hillsborough Township, New Jersey, near New York City, where he works as an Editor for South Asia Journal.  He attends many poetry readings in Manhattan and Queens and is a famous figure among the Indians and New York poets.

Datta was born in West Bengal in 1936, but grew up in various places in India, mostly South India.  He had nine siblings in all. He was brought up in forest areas and was 11 when India gained independence from the British.  His wife, Minakshi Datta, is the past President of "Tagore Society of New York". Minakshi Datta is the daughter of another important figure in Bengali poetry, Buddhadev Bose. Her mother was the singer and writer, Protibha Bose, many of whose novels have been bestsellers and have been made into hit movies.

Datta was in conflict with Indian Prime Minister Indira Gandhi in the late 1970s. He wrote a story critical of her in his magazine Kolkata.  His family was watched by the Indian government in this time period. He had to become a fugitive for more than two years and once jumped from a three-story house to escape from the police. His ankle was badly injured because of this event. He was finally captured by the police and was imprisoned at the Presidency Jail in Calcutta. However, six months into his imprisonment, the elections were held and he was released. Indira Gandhi was defeated and all charges against him were dropped.

After coming back to freedom in triumph, Datta went on an expedition on a sailing boat from Calcutta to Sri Lanka.

Datta is the father of two children.  His daughter, Kankawati Datta, has written a few books and is the editor "Personae" magazine. His son, Mallinath Datta, is an executive at a large advertising agency and also an independent film director who directed Full Masti.

Datta, along with Sunil Gangopadhyay, Tarun Sanyal and Satrajit Datta were defense witnesses in the trial of Hungryalist poet Malay Roy Choudhury, which shows his greatness, since he did not agree with the Hungryalist school of poetry.

References

External links
Datta's Poetry at Shabdaguchha: Bengali Poetry Collection

Indian male journalists
Bengali male poets
Indian male essayists
1936 births
Living people
People from Hillsborough Township, New Jersey
Indian male poets
20th-century Indian essayists
20th-century Indian poets
Writers from Kolkata
20th-century Indian male writers